The VSO 10 Vosa (Vosa – Gradient) is a Standard and Club-Class glider designed and manufactured in the Czechoslovak Republic from December 1978 as a replacement for the VT-116 Orlik II.

Development
Development of the VSO 10 started in 1972 and the first prototype flew on 16 September 1977. The Type Certificate was granted on 15 May 1979, with the first production gliders entering service with Czechoslovak aeroclubs soon after. In 1990 the company ceased production when they started to build Schempp-Hirth gliders. Schempp-Hirth are the current holders of the VSO 10 Type Certificate.

Design
The VSO 10 is a mixed-construction glider with wooden and steel tube structural members, aluminium alloy rear fuselage and glass-fibre sandwich skins. The wings are shoulder-mounted and the tailplane is mounted on top of the integral fin. Conventional control surfaces include all-wooden slotted ailerons, all-metal DFS airbrakes on the upper and lower surfaces of the wing and fabric-covered all-metal elevators and rudder. The undercarriage in the Standard Class aircraft is a manually retractable rubber-sprung monowheel with a drum brake, (non-retractable in the Club-Class aircraft), with a rubber-mounted steel skid under the tail. The pilot is accommodated in a fully reclined seat under a two-piece canopy.

Variants
VSO 10B Vosa (Gradient)
Retractable landing gear variant
VSO 10C Vosa Club (Gradient Club)
Fixed landing gear variant

Specifications (VSO 10)

See also

References

Further reading

External links
European Aviation Safety Agency - Type Certificate Data Sheet VSO 10

1970s Czechoslovakian sailplanes
Glider aircraft
Shoulder-wing aircraft
T-tail aircraft
Aircraft first flown in 1976